William Smith Jewett (1821–1873) was an American painter.

Jewett was born in South Dover, New York. He studied painting at the New York Academy of Design, where he became an associate in 1845. He sold many paintings through the American Art-Union, and he exhibited his artwork at the Academy of Design in 1841–1851. Jewett moved to San Francisco, California in 1851, where he joined the Society of California Pioneers and he did many portraits of pioneers like him, including John Sutter. Jewett died in Springfield, Massachusetts. His son, William Dunbar Jewett, became a sculptor.

References

1821 births
1873 deaths
People from Dover, New York
National Academy of Design associates
19th-century American painters
19th-century male artists
American portrait painters
California pioneers